Dumun may be,

Dumun language
Al-Dumun village, Palestine